Islam in Oceania refers to Islam and Muslims in Oceania. By current estimates, there are 620,156 total Muslims in Oceania: 476,600 in Australia, 48,151 in New Zealand, 52,520 in Fiji, 6,352 in New Caledonia, 2,200 in Papua New Guinea, 360 in Solomon Islands, 221 in Vanuatu, 110 in Tonga.

According to a 2007 article in Pacific Magazine, entitled 'Green Moon Rising', Islam has seen a substantial increase in adherents amongst the peoples of Vanuatu, Fiji, Solomon Islands, Papua New Guinea and New Caledonia. There have been thousands of indigenous converts to Islam in Melanesia.

There are also approximately 400 Muslims in Palau, whose government recently allowed a few Uyghurs detained in Guantanamo Bay to settle in the island nation.

History
Islam has been in some parts of Oceania possibly as early as the 16th century due to contacts with the largely Muslim regions in Indonesia. When the people of New Guinea traded with China and the Malay empire, in the early 17th century, the presence of Islam was felt in Oceania for the first time.

Regions like Western New Guinea have established native Muslim populations. Islam first arrived to the region via Moluccan influence in the 17th century although Muslim merchants conducted trade with the western Papuans since at least the 15th century.

Other parts of Oceania did not feel the presence of Islam until the 19th century. For instance, the first Muslims in Fiji came when Muslim migrants came on a ship bringing indentured labourers to Fiji in 1879. Muslims consisted of 22% of the boarders on Leonidas, which was the first such ship.

Demographics
 Cocos ( Keeling ) Islands : 75 % Muslim.

See also
 Algerians of the Pacific
 Afghan (Australia)
 Māori Muslims
 Islam Day (Hawaii)

References

External links
 Religion in Oceania at Open Directory Project

 
Religion in Oceania